Cerocala sana is a moth of the family Erebidae first described by Otto Staudinger in 1901. It is found in North Africa, Iran, Iraq, Bahrain and Israel.

There are two generations per year. Adults are on wing from October to April.

The larvae feed on Helianthemum kahiricum and Helianthemum lipii.

External links

Image

Ophiusina
Moths of Africa
Moths of Asia
Moths described in 1901